Stage 42 (known as the Little Shubert Theatre until July 2015) is a theatre in New York City on Theatre Row, about half a mile west of Broadway.  Its address is 422 West 42nd Street, between 9th Avenue and Dyer Avenue.  It was built in 2002 and has a seating capacity of 499, counting as an Off-Broadway theatre (fewer than 500 seats).

The Little Shubert was the first Off-Broadway theatre in New York built from the ground up, and the first to be owned by the Shubert Organization. Built as part of a residential tower and opened in 2002, the Little Shubert was the first new theatre built by the Shubert Organization in New York City since 1928, when the Ethel Barrymore opened on West 47th Street. Features of Stage 42 include an auditorium with stadium seating providing proximity to the stage. The stage itself and the orchestra pit are comparable in size to the dimensions of many Broadway theatres.

Stage 42 is one of the largest Off Broadway theatres but has proven to be an expensive venue to mount shows, partly due to contracts with theatrical unions. In 2011, theater producers speculated that Stage 42 might become a Tony-eligible Broadway house by the addition of one seat to bring it to the 500 seat minimum required for Tony eligibility; this has not happened, as going to 500 seats would require negotiating new contracts with the unions, raising costs further.

Show history
As the Little Shubert:
Tommy Tune: White Tie and Tails, November 26, 2002 - January 5, 2003
Hank Williams: Lost Highway, March 26, 2003 - July 20, 2003
Fame on 42nd Street, October 7, 2003 - June 27, 2004
Shockheaded Peter, February 11, 2005 - May 29, 2005
Captain Louie, October 28, 2005 - November 13, 2005
My Mother's Italian, My Father's Jewish and I'm in Therapy!, November 3, 2006 - April 29, 2007
Three Mo' Tenors, September 12, 2007 - January 27, 2008
Viagara Falls, July 5, 2010 - August 29, 2010
Dracula, December 14, 2010 - January 9, 2011
Lucky Guy, April 28, 2011 - May 29, 2011
Potted Potter: The Unauthorized Harry Experience, May 19, 2012 - September 2, 2012
Potted Potter: The Unauthorized Harry Experience, May 30, 2013 - September 1, 2013
Lady Day, September 19, 2013 - December 22, 2013
Under My Skin, April 5, 2014 - June 8, 2014

As Stage 42:
Trip of Love, September 26, 2015 - August 7, 2016
Smokey Joe's Cafe, July 6, 2018 - November 4, 2018
 Fidler Afn Dakh, February 11, 2019 – January 5, 2020
Trevor, October 25, 2021 - December 19, 2021
 Kinky Boots, July 26, 2022 – November 20, 2022

References

External links
 Shubert Organization Official Site
 Stage 42 New York Show Guide
 

Theatres in Manhattan
Off-Broadway theaters
Shubert Organization
Hell's Kitchen, Manhattan
Theatres completed in 2002
2002 establishments in New York City